Sabrina Ashley Vida Santamaria (born February 24, 1993) is an American tennis player.

Career
She has a career-high singles ranking of world No. 384, achieved in June 2016, and a best WTA doubles ranking of 53, set on 12 August 2019.

Alongside Jarmere Jenkins, she was given a wildcard into the mixed-doubles tournament of the 2013 US Open where they lost in the first round to Alizé Cornet and Édouard Roger-Vasselin. She was awarded a wildcard into the 2015 US Open women's doubles event alongside Kaitlyn Christian.

Santamaria graduated from the University of Southern California in 2015 with a degree in International Relations. During her collegiate career, she was the 2013 NCAA Doubles Champion alongside Christian, while being the 2013 Pac-12 Player of the Year and Doubles Team of the Year. She was also the 2013 World University Games silver medalist in singles in Kazan, Russia.

Personal life
Santamaria was born in the United States to a Panamanian father and Philippine mother.

Performance timeline

Doubles

WTA career finals

Doubles: 6 (1 title, 5 runner-ups)

WTA Challenger finals

Doubles: 1 (title)

ITF Circuit finals

Singles: 3 (2 titles, 1 runner–up)

Doubles: 19 (14 titles, 5 runner–ups)

Notes

References

External links
 
 
 USC Trojans profile

1993 births
Living people
American female tennis players
Tennis players from Los Angeles
USC Trojans women's tennis players
Universiade medalists in tennis
Universiade silver medalists for the United States
Medalists at the 2013 Summer Universiade
American sportspeople of Filipino descent
American sportspeople of Panamanian descent